"East of Eden" is a song by Scottish rock band Big Country, which was released in 1984 as the lead single from their second studio album Steeltown. It was written by Big Country and produced by Steve Lillywhite. "East of Eden" reached No. 17 in the UK, and No. 12 in Ireland.

Background
Speaking to Number One in 1984, Adamson said of the song: "It's a questioning song, a song about always having to look for any hope or inspiration." A music video was filmed in Glasgow to promote the single, directed by Mike Brady. The single's B-side, "Prairie Rose", is a cover of the 1974 song by Roxy Music.

Critical reception
Upon release, Karen Swayne of Number One said: ""East of Eden" is as powerful and majestic as anything they've done." Vici MacDonald of Smash Hits commented: "The production on this record is truly awful. The instruments blur into one muddy, thrashing mass, completely submerging any hapless tune which might be struggling to escape."

Track listing
7" single
"East of Eden" - 4:10
"Prairie Rose" - 4:50

12" single
"East of Eden (Extended Version)" - 6:22
"East of Eden" - 4:24
"Prairie Rose" - 4:44

12" single (US promo)
"East of Eden" - 4:09
"East of Eden" - 4:09

Chart performance

Personnel
Big Country
Stuart Adamson - vocals, guitar
Bruce Watson - guitar
Tony Butler - bass
Mark Brzezicki - drums, percussion

Production
Steve Lillywhite - producer
Will Gosling - engineer

Other
Jeremy Bird - sleeve design
Brian Aris - sleeve photography
Grant-Edwards Management - management

References

1984 songs
1984 singles
Mercury Records singles
Big Country songs
Songs written by Stuart Adamson
Song recordings produced by Steve Lillywhite